is a Japanese economist.  Doi received his B.A. degree from Osaka University in 1993 and Ph.D. degree from the University of Tokyo in 1999. He is currently associate professor of economics at Keio University from 1999.

In 2007, Doi was awarded the Fiftieth Nikkei Prize for Excellent Books in Economic Science, Japan Center for Economic Research, and the Twenty-ninth Suntory Prize for Social Sciences, Suntory Foundation.

References

External links
Takero Doi's web site

Japanese economists
1970 births
Living people
People from Nara, Nara
University of Tokyo alumni
Osaka University alumni